Lalapaşa (literally "tutor pasha") is a Turkish name and may refer to:
 Lalapaşa, a town and district center in Edirne Province, Turkey 
 Lələpaşa, a village in Qakh Rayon, Azerbaijan

See also 
Lala (title)
Lala Şahin Pasha
Lala Kara Mustafa Pasha
Tekeli Lala Mehmet Pasha